Tienkoikro is a town in eastern Ivory Coast. It is a sub-prefecture of Koun-Fao Department in Gontougo Region, Zanzan District.

Tienkoikro was a commune until March 2012, when it became one of 1126 communes nationwide that were abolished.

In 2014, the population of the sub-prefecture of Tienkoikro was 13,417.

Villages
The twelve villages of the sub-prefecture of Tienkoikro and their population in 2014 are:
 Akakobénankro (662)
 Allikouassué (1 009)
 Assuamakro (944)
 Attakro (844)
 Broffouédou (567)
 Déimba (1 991)
 Kobenan-Bango (144)
 Kodjinan (582)
 M'békouadiokro (1 019)
 N'guessan-Brindoukro (1 466)
 Presso (2 556)
 Tienkoikro (1 633)

Notes

Sub-prefectures of Gontougo
Former communes of Ivory Coast